Anthony John Dyson (13 April 1947 – 4 March 2016) was a British SPFX designer, best-known for working on the R2-D2 droid props used in the Empire Strikes Back and subsequent films in the Star Wars film series.

Life
Born in Dewsbury, West Yorkshire he visited the private Stratton House School in Abingdon.

He founded rocking horse manufacturer The White Horse Toy Company in Crawley, a small village near Oxford. The company was commissioned by special visual effects supervisor Brian Johnson to fabricate fibreglass shells for the rebuilt R2-D2 props. These were used in the Star Wars sequel, the Empire Strikes Back, and were based on the designs of Ralph McQuarrie, John Stears and others. His team built around eight bodies. Two were used by Kenny Baker, two were stunt shells used for scenes such as shooting the droid from the swamp onto the shore on Dagobah, and most of the rest were mechanized with radio controllers by an effects team at EMI Studios.

Dyson also created robotics and props for Superman II, Moonraker, and Dragonslayer. He also worked on Saturn 3.

In the mid 1980s, he moved with his family to Kissamos on the island of Crete where he created a robotics lab as well as a western themed arcade, where several of his cowboy robots were used as interactive arcade games.

In the 1990s, he moved to Malta and founded Turn Page Studios in St. Paul's Bay. He died on the island of Gozo.

Awards
Dyson was knighted in the Byzantine Order of the Holy Sepulchre for promoting philanthropic, cultural and ecumenical activities.

In 1985, he was nominated for an Emmy Award for a Sony commercial featuring a John Cleese look-alike robot.

In 2013 he was honored with the title of Honorary Professor MBA in multimedia for the Stichting Euregio University in the Netherlands.

References

External links

1947 births
2016 deaths
Special effects coordinators
British roboticists
British expatriates in Malta